The Spanish conquest of the Aztec Empire occurred in the 16th century. The basic staples since then remain native foods such as corn, beans, squash and chili peppers, but the Europeans introduced many other foods, the most important of which were meat from domesticated animals, dairy products (especially cheese) and various herbs and spices, although key spices in Mexican cuisine are also native to Mesoamerica such as a large variety of chilli peppers.

Antojitos
Street food in Mexico, called antojitos, is prepared by street vendors and at small traditional markets in Mexico. Most of them include corn as an ingredient.

 Aguachile
 Avocado
 Bolillos
 Burrito
 Burro percherón
 Camote (Mexican sweet potato)

 Chahuis
 Cemitas sandwiches
 Chalupa
 Chapulines
 Charales, small fish, basically a type of smelt
 Chicharrón

 Chilaquiles

 Chimichangas (Tex-Mex mostly)
 Choriqueso
 Chorizo

 Cochinita pibil
 Cocido
 Cóctel de camarón and other seafood cocktails

 Corunda
 Curtido
 Elote
 Empanadas
 Enchilada (red or green)
 Enfrijoladas
 Ensalada de fruta (fruit salad)
 Entomatadas
 Escamoles
 Fajitas
 Filete de pescado
 Flautas
 Frijoles charros
 Fritada
 Gorditas
 Gringas
 Huauzontles
 Huaraches
 Huitlacoche
 Japanese peanuts
 Jicama
 Jocoque
 Jumiles
 Lengua
 Lentil soup (lentil beans)
 Longaniza
 Machaca
 Maguey worm
 Mancha manteles
 Memela
 Menudo
 Mixiotes
 Mole de olla
 Mole poblano
 Molletes
 Molotes
 Moronga
* Nachos
 Pambazos
 Panucho
 Papadzules
 Parilladas
 Pastel azteca
 Pejelagarto
 Picadillo
 Quesadillas
 Queso
 Rajas con crema
 Romeritos
 Salbutes
 Salsa
 Sincronizadas
 Sopes
 Tacos
 Taco al pastor
 Tacos de sesos
 Tamales
 Taquitos
 Tlacoyos
 Tlayudas
 Tortas (sandwiches)
 Tortillas
 Tostadas
 Tostilocos
 Totopo
 Tripas
 Venado (venison), particularly in the Yucatan
 Yuca (cassava)

Cheese  dishes

 Caldo de queso
 Queso flameado

Egg dishes

 Huevos motuleños
 Huevos rancheros
 Migas

Meat dishes

Beef dishes

 Albóndigas, Mexican meatballs.
 Aporreadillo
 Beef brain
 Bistec
 Carne asada, grilled beef
 Carne a la tampiqueña, carne asada that is usually accompanied by a small portion of enchiladas (or chilaquiles), refried beans, fresh cheese, guacamole, and a vegetable (often rajas; grilled slices of Poblano peppers).
 Cecina – In Mexico, most cecina is of two kinds: sheets of marinated beef, and a pork cut that is pounded thin and coated with chili pepper (this type is called cecina enchilada or carne enchilada).
 Milanesas – Chicken, beef, and a pork breaded fried bisteces.

Goat dishes
 Cabrito

Pork dishes
 Calabacitas con puerco
 Carnitas
 Chilorio
 Chorizo
 Cochinita pibil
 Pickled pigs' feet
 Poc Chuc

Poultry dishes
 Chicken feet
 Pollo asado
 Pollo motuleño

Other meat and protein dishes
 Barbacoa
 Birria – a spicy stew from the state of Jalisco traditionally made from goat meat or mutton
 Chapulines – toasted grasshoppers seasoned with salt & lime
 Escamol – the edible larvae and pupae of ants
 Pastel azteca
 Puntas
 Queso de Puerco, head cheese prepared with vinegar, garlic, oregano and black pepper, among others. Wheels are often sold covered in paraffin wax. Non dairy.
 Discada

Moles, sauces, dips and spreads
 Chamoy
 Guacamole
 Mole blanco
 Mole sauce
 Mole verde
 Pepian – green or red, meat, pork
 Salsa
 Salsa chipotle
 Salsa verde

Rice dishes

 Arroz a la tumbada (rice with seafood)
 Arroz con pollo (rice with chicken)
 Arroz negro (black rice)
 Arroz poblano
 Arroz rojo (red rice, Mexican rice, or Spanish rice)
 Morisqueta

Seafood dishes
 Aguachile
 Huachinango a la Veracruzana

Soups and stews

 Birria
 caldo de pollo, chicken soup
 caldo de queso, cheese soup
 caldo de mariscos, seafood soup
 caldo tlalpeño, chicken, broth, chopped avocado, chile chipotle and fried tortilla strips or triangles – may include white cheese, vegetables, chickpeas, carrot, green beans
 Fideos (noodles)
 Menudo
 Pozole
 Sopa de fideo
 sopa de flor de calabaza
 Sopa de lima, from Yucatán
 Sopa de nueces, walnut soup
 Sopa de pollo (chicken soup)
 Sopa de tortilla (tortilla soup)

Vegetable dishes

 Chile relleno
 Chiles en nogada
 Cuitlacoche, a fungus that grows on corn plants, often served in soups
 Egg rolls
 Frijoles
 Frijoles pintos (pinto beans)
 Frijoles negros (black beans)
 Frijoles charros
 Frijoles Puercos
 Frijoles refritos (refried beans)
 Nopalitos
 Papas (potatoes)
 Pico de gallo

Desserts and sweets

Mexico's candy and bakery sweets industry, centered in Michoacán and Mexico City, produces a wide array of products.
 Alfajor
 Arroz con leche, rice pudding
 Bionico, type of fruit salad with cream
 Buñuelos
 Brazo de gitano
 Cajeta
 Calavera
 Capirotada
 Champurrado
 Chongos zamoranos, cheese candy named for its place of origin, Zamora, Michoacán
 Chocolate
 Chocolate brownie
 Churros
 Cocadas
 Coconut candy
 Cochinito de Piloncillo
 Concha
 Coyotas
 Dulce de leche

 Flan
 Frozen banana
 Ice cream ("nieves" and "helados"). 
 Fried ice cream
 Manjar blanco
 Mazapán de Cacahuate
 Nicuatole
 Paletas, popsicles (or ice lollies), the street popsicle vendor is a noted fixture of Mexico's urban landscape.
 Palmier

 Pan de muerto, sugar covered pieces of bread traditionally eaten at the Día de muertos festivity
 Pan dulce, sweet pastries in many shapes and sizes that are very popular for breakfast. Nearly every Mexican town has a bakery (panaderia) where these can purchased.
 Pastel de tres leches (Three Milk Cake)
 Platano
 Polvorón
 Rosca de reyes
 Sopaipilla
 Tacuarines, Biscochos, or Coricos

Beverages

Non-alcoholic

 Aguas frescas
 Atole
 Café de olla, coffee with cinnamon
 Chamoyada
 Champurrado
 Chia Fresca
 Chocolate, generally known better as a drink rather than a candy or sweet
 Hot chocolate
 Horchata
 Jamaica (drink)
 Jarritos (drink)
 Jugos frescos
 Lechuguilla
 Licuado, drink that includes banana, chocolate, and sugar
 Mangonada
 Mexican Coke
 Mexican tea culture
 Pópo
 Pozol
 Sangria Señorial
 Tascalate
 Tamarindo
 Tejate

Alcoholic

 Bacanora
 Cerveza, Mexican beers such as "Sol" and "Corona"
 Colonche
 Mexican wine
 Mezcal
 Michelada
 Pulque, popular drink of the Aztecs
 Sotol
 Tejuino
 Tepache
 Tequila
 Tubâ

See also

 List of cuisines
 List of maize dishes
 List of tortilla-based dishes
 Mexican breads
 Mexican street food
 New Mexican cuisine
 Sopaipilla (not typical in Mexico, but common in New Mexico)
Tex-Mex

References

External links

 

Lists of foods by nationality

Dishes